Ivey Delph Apartments is a historic apartment building in Hamilton Heights, Manhattan, New York City. It was designed by noted African American architect Vertner Woodson Tandy (1885 – 1949) in 1948 and completed in 1951.  It is a six-story, beige brick and concrete building in the Moderne style.  It is a three bay wide building and the center bay features projecting balconies with curved ends and topped by curved iron railings with two horizontal bars.  It is located within the Hamilton Heights Historic District.

It was listed on the National Register of Historic Places in 2005.

References

Residential buildings on the National Register of Historic Places in Manhattan
Moderne architecture in New York City
Residential buildings completed in 1951
Residential buildings in Manhattan
Apartment buildings in New York City
Hamilton Heights, Manhattan
Art Deco architecture in Manhattan
1951 establishments in New York City